Puru is a legendary king in Hinduism. He is the youngest son of King Yayati and Sharmishtha, and one of ancestors of the Pandavas and the Kauravas. King Puru marries Kausalya, and is succeeded by his son, Janamajeya.

Legend

Bhagavata Purana 
thumb|Puru enthroned by Yayati, made by Bhawani from Razmnama

In the nineteenth chapter of book nine of the Bhagavata Purana, Puru is described as having four brothers; Yadu, Turvasu, Druhyu, and Anu. He exchanges his youth for the old age of his father Yayati when the latter gets cursed by Shukracharya, allowing his father to enjoy his youth for a thousand years. Afterwards, Yayati takes back his curse and makes Puru his heir, though he is the youngest of them all. His successor is Práchinvat; his son is Pravíra; his son is Manasyu.

Mahabharata 
In the Mahabharata's Adi Parva, he is said to have inherited his kingdom in the Gangetic plain. He is said to have three mighty heroes as sons by his wife Paushti; Pravira, Īśvara, and Raudrāśva. Pravira succeeded Puru, and was in turn succeeded by his son, Manasyu.

Puru's dynasty becomes the Puruvamsha, which was later renamed as Kuruvamsha, to which the Pandavas and the Kauravas belong.

Rigveda 
Another Puru is mentioned as a king in the Rigveda and as the father of Adityas, married to Aditi, living and ruling over and area of the Sarasvati river.

See also
 Lunar Dynasty
 Yayati
 Pauravas

Further reading
 Mahabharata,  Adiparva, verse. 71-80.

Notes

References

 

Characters in Hindu mythology
 Mythological kings
 Characters in the Mahabharata
Lunar dynasty